Fairview is a historic home located near Amherst, Amherst County, Virginia.  It was built in 1867, and is a -story Italian Villa style brick dwelling. It has a three-story tower set at a 45-degree angle to the primary elevation.  The house features a low-pitched roof with overhanging eaves, wide frieze with decorative brackets, arched windows, and a bay window.  Also on the property are the contributing late-19th century smokehouse and tenant house (c. 1920).

It was added to the National Register of Historic Places in 2009.

References

External links
Owner's website
Virginia DHR listing

Houses in Amherst County, Virginia
Houses completed in 1867
Italianate architecture in Virginia
Houses on the National Register of Historic Places in Virginia
National Register of Historic Places in Amherst County, Virginia